Malonyl CoA-acyl carrier protein transacylase, mitochondrial is an enzyme that in humans is encoded by the MCAT gene.

Function 

The protein encoded by this gene is found exclusively in the mitochondrion, where it catalyzes the transfer of a malonyl group from malonyl-CoA to the mitochondrial acyl carrier protein. The encoded protein may be part of a fatty acid synthase complex that is more like the type II prokaryotic and plastid complexes rather than the type I human cytosolic complex. Two transcript variants encoding different isoforms have been found for this gene.

Clinical significance

The enzyme encoded by the MCAT gene, along with other enzymes that regulate Malonyl-CoA concentration, have been shown to regulate levels such that malonyl-CoA concentration decreases in human muscle tissue when under exercise training. This enzyme specifically has increased activity under these conditions, as it is known to catabolize malonyl-CoA.

Interactions 

The human Malonyl CoA-acel carrier protein transacylase in human mitochondria associates with respiratory complex one, such that it interacts functionally with a mitochondrial malonyltransferase. Both species are encoded by nuclear genes, and their translocation into mitochondria is dependent on the presence of an N-terminal targeting sequence.

References

Further reading